HMS Olympus was an Odin-class submarine, a class originally designed for the Royal Australian Navy to cope with long distance patrolling in Pacific waters.
Olympus was built to the same design for the Royal Navy. 
She served from 1931 to 1939 on the China Station and 1939-1940 out of Colombo.  In 1940 she went to the Mediterranean. She was sunk by a mine off Malta in May 1942 killing 89 crew. 9 survivors: Herbert Rawlings,

Service
From 1931 to 1939 Olympus was part of the 4th Flotilla on the China Station. From 1939 to 1940 she was with the 8th Flotilla, Colombo, Ceylon. In 1940 she was redeployed to the Mediterranean. She was damaged on 7 July 1940 when bombed by Italian aircraft while in dock in Malta. Repairs and refit were completed on 29 November 1940. On 9 November 1941 Olympus attacked the Italian merchant ship Mauro Croce (1,049 GRT) with torpedoes and gunfire in the Gulf of Genoa. The target escaped without damage.

On 8 May 1942 Olympus struck a mine and sank off Malta in approximate position 35°55'N, 14°35'E. She had just left Malta on passage to Gibraltar with personnel including many of the crews of the submarines Pandora, P36 and P39 which had been sunk in air raids. There were only 9 survivors out of 98 aboard. 
Survivors:
Herbert Rawlings
They had to swim  back to Malta. 89 crew and passengers were lost with the ship.

During the War Olympus was adopted by the Town of Peterborough as part of Warship Week.  The plaque from this adoption is held by the National Museum of the Royal Navy in Portsmouth.

Discovery

Although a team of divers from the United Kingdom and Malta had claimed discovery of the wreck in 2008, its identity was not confirmed until a team from the Aurora Trust was able to re-locate the wreck in 2011 and capture images with a ROV later in the year. The wreck sits upright in 115m of water and is largely intact.

Malta authorities gave the trust permission to announce the confirmation on 10 January 2012.

References

Bibliography
 D.K. Brown - Nelson to Vanguard, Chatham Maritime Press

External links
Battleships-cruisers.co.uk: Odin Class
Uboat.net
US diving crew finds wreck of British submarine used in second world war. Retrieved 12 January 2012.
RN Subs 1925 - 1946: Odin Class

Odin-class submarines of the Royal Navy
Ships built on the River Clyde
1928 ships
World War II submarines of the United Kingdom
Lost submarines of the United Kingdom
World War II shipwrecks in the Mediterranean Sea
Maritime incidents in May 1942
Ships sunk by mines
Shipwrecks of Malta